Novy Urkarakh (Dargwa: Сагаси Уркарахъ) is a rural locality (a selo) in Urkarkhsky Selsoviet, Dakhadayevsky District, Republic of Dagestan, Russia. The population was 1,101 as of 2010. There are 9 streets.

Nationalities 
Dargins live there.

References 

Rural localities in Dakhadayevsky District